Harry Potter and the Philosopher's Stone is a 1997 fantasy novel written by British author J. K. Rowling. The first novel in the Harry Potter series and Rowling's debut novel, it follows Harry Potter, a young wizard who discovers his magical heritage on his eleventh birthday, when he receives a letter of acceptance to Hogwarts School of Witchcraft and Wizardry. Harry makes close friends and a few enemies during his first year at the school and with the help of his friends, Ron Weasley and Hermione Granger, he faces an attempted comeback by the dark wizard Lord Voldemort, who killed Harry's parents, but failed to kill Harry when he was just 15 months old.

The book was first published in the United Kingdom on 26 June 1997 by Bloomsbury. It was published in the United States the following year by Scholastic Corporation under the title Harry Potter and the Sorcerer's Stone. It won most of the British book awards that were judged by children and other awards in the US. The book reached the top of the New York Times list of best-selling fiction in August 1999 and stayed near the top of that list for much of 1999 and 2000. It has been translated into at least 73 other languages and has been made into a feature-length film of the same name, as have all six of its sequels. The novel has sold in excess of 120 million copies, making it the third best-selling novel of all time.

Most reviews were very favourable, commenting on Rowling's imagination, humour, simple, direct style and clever plot construction, although a few complained that the final chapters seemed rushed. The writing has been compared to that of Jane Austen, one of Rowling's favourite authors; Roald Dahl, whose works dominated children's stories before the appearance of Harry Potter; and the ancient Greek story-teller Homer. While some commentators thought the book looked backwards to Victorian and Edwardian boarding school stories, others thought it placed the genre firmly in the modern world by featuring contemporary ethical and social issues, as well as overcoming obstacles like bullies.

The Harry Potter series has been used as a source of object lessons in educational techniques, sociological analysis and marketing.

Synopsis

Plot

Harry Potter lives with his abusive aunt and uncle, Vernon and Petunia Dursley, and their bullying son, Dudley. On Harry's eleventh birthday, a half-giant named Rubeus Hagrid personally delivers an acceptance letter to Hogwarts School of Witchcraft and Wizardry, revealing that Harry's parents, James and Lily Potter, were wizards. When Harry was one year old, an evil and powerful dark wizard, Lord Voldemort, murdered his parents. Harry survived Voldemort's killing curse that rebounded and seemingly destroyed the Dark Lord, leaving a lightning bolt-shaped scar on his forehead. Unknown to Harry, this act made him famous in the wizarding world.

Hagrid escorts Harry to Diagon Alley, the hidden wizard commerce and retail section in London. Harry's parents have left him a fortune kept in Gringotts Wizarding Bank, which he uses to buy school supplies and a wand from Ollivander's. The cores of Harry and Lord Voldemort's wands have feathers from the same phoenix bird, making them "brothers". Hagrid gifts Harry an owl as a birthday present. Harry names her Hedwig. A month later, Harry boards the Hogwarts Express at King's Cross railway station's secret Platform 9¾. On the journey to Hogwarts, Harry befriends fellow first year Ron Weasley and meets Hermione Granger, whom the two boys initially dislike. 

Harry runs afoul of Draco Malfoy, the spoiled son of a prominent wizard. At Hogwarts, a magical Sorting Hat sorts the first years among four school Houses (Gryffindor, Hufflepuff, Ravenclaw, and Slytherin) that best suit their personalities and talents. Draco joins Slytherin, known for producing dark wizards, while Harry, Ron, and Hermione are sorted into Gryffindor.

Harry's broomstick flying ability earns him a place on the Gryffindor Quidditch team as the Seeker. Harry comes to dislike Potions master Severus Snape, who favours Slytherin while seeking to fail Harry. Malfoy tricks Harry and Ron into risking expulsion by leaving their common room after curfew. Hermione, unable to stop them, tags along. Realising Malfoy's ruse, they hide in a forbidden corridor and discover a gigantic three-headed dog guarding a trapdoor. Harry and Ron later save Hermione from a troll during the school's Halloween celebration and the three become best friends. Coupled with Snape's recent leg injury and suspicious behaviour, Harry, Ron, and Hermione believe he is attempting to enter the trapdoor.

Hermione warns the boys against investigating further and instead directs Harry's attention to his first Quidditch match. His broomstick's attempts to buck him off and Snape's strange behaviour during the match convinces Hermione he jinxed Harry's broom. Harry receives an anonymous Christmas gift – his father's invisibility cloak. Using it to explore the school, he discovers the Mirror of Erised, which shows what the viewer most desires. Harry sees his parents.

The trio read a newspaper report about an attempted robbery at Gringotts Bank and the same vault from which Hagrid retrieved an item for the school's headmaster Albus Dumbledore on the same day. They suspect the object beneath the trapdoor is the philosopher's stone, which grants its user immortality and the ability to turn any metal into pure gold. A forest centaur named Firenze warns Harry that Voldemort is plotting to steal the stone to restore his body. When Dumbledore is lured from Hogwarts under false pretences, Harry, Hermione, and Ron fear the theft is imminent and descend through the trapdoor.

A series of obstacles force Ron and Hermione to remain behind while Harry proceeds. Harry encounters Professor Quirrell, the Defence Against the Dark Arts teacher, who reveals that he jinxed Harry's broom and let the troll into the school; Snape was protecting Harry. Voldemort, whose face has slowly regrown on the back of Quirrell's head, is revealed to be the professor's secret master. Harry is forced to stand before the Mirror of Erised. It recognises Harry's lack of greed for the stone and deposits it into his pocket. Quirrell attempts to seize the stone, but his flesh burns upon contact with Harry. Harry's scar begins hurting and he passes out.

Harry awakens in the school's infirmary. Dumbledore explains Harry survived Voldemort because his mother sacrificing her life for him left a magical protective charm. Quirrell's hatred and greed caused him to burn upon contact with Harry; Voldemort abandoned him to die. Dumbledore reveals he sent Harry the invisibility cloak, while the philosopher's stone, that had been keeping the long-lived Nicolas Flamel alive, has been destroyed with Flamel's consent to prevent its being stolen. During the school's year-end feast, Gryffindor is awarded the House Cup. Harry returns to the Dursleys at Privet Drive until the next school year.

Characters 

 Harry Potter is an orphan whom Rowling imagined as a "scrawny, black-haired, green eyed and bespectacled boy who didn't know he was a wizard." She developed the series' story and characters to explain how Harry came to be in this situation and how his life unfolded from there. Apart from the first chapter, the events of this book take place just before and in the year following Harry's eleventh birthday. Voldemort's attack left a lightning bolt-shaped scar on Harry's forehead, which produces stabbing pains whenever Voldemort is present. Harry has a natural talent for Quidditch and became the first person in a century to get on their team in their first year.
 Ron Weasley is Harry's age, and Rowling describes him as the ultimate best friend "always there when you need him." He is freckled, red-haired, and quite tall. He grew up in a fairly large pure-blood family as the sixth born of seven children. Although his family is quite poor, they still live comfortably and happily. His loyalty and bravery in the face of a game of Wizards Chess plays a vital part in finding the Philosopher's Stone.
 Hermione Granger, the daughter of an all-Muggle family, is a bossy girl who has apparently memorised most of the textbooks before the start of term. Rowling described Hermione as a "very logical, upright and good" character with "a lot of insecurity and a great fear of failure beneath her swottiness". Despite her nagging efforts to keep Harry and Ron out of trouble, she becomes a close friend of the two boys after they save her from a troll and her magical and analytical skills play an important role in finding the Philosopher's Stone. She has bushy brown hair and rather large front teeth.
 Neville Longbottom is a plump, diffident boy, so forgetful that his grandmother gives him a Remembrall, to remind him if he forgets something. Neville's magical abilities are weak and appeared just in time to save his life when he was eight. Despite his timidity, Neville will fight anyone after some encouragement or if he thinks it is right and important.
Hagrid is fiercely loyal to Dumbledore and quickly becomes a close friend of Harry, Ron and, later, Hermione, but his carelessness makes him unreliable.
 Professor Albus Dumbledore, a tall, thin man who wears half-moon spectacles and has silver hair and a beard that tucks into his belt, is the headmaster of Hogwarts, and thought to be the only wizard Voldemort fears. Dumbledore, while renowned for his achievements in magic, shrugs off praise, though he is aware of his own brilliance. Rowling described him as the "epitome of goodness".
 Professor Minerva McGonagall, a tall, severe-looking woman with black hair tied in a tight bun, teaches Transfiguration and is able to transform herself into a cat. She is Deputy Headmistress and Head of Gryffindor House.
 Petunia Dursley, the sister of Harry's mother Lily, is a thin woman with a long neck that she uses for spying on the neighbours. As a muggle, she regards her magical sister as a freak and tries to pretend that she never existed.
 Vernon Dursley, the husband of Petunia Dursley, is a heavily built man whose irascible bluster covers a narrow mind and a fear of anything unusual.
 Dudley Dursley is an overweight, spoilt bully and Harry's cousin.
 Draco Malfoy is a slim, pale boy who speaks in a bored drawl. He is arrogant about his skill in Quidditch, and despises anyone who is not a pure-blood wizard  and wizards who do not share his views. His parents had supported Voldemort, but changed sides after the dark wizard's disappearance, claiming they had been bewitched. Draco avoids direct confrontations and tries to get Harry and his friends into trouble.
 Oliver Wood is Harry's Quidditch captain and keeper for the Gryffindor Quidditch team.
 Professor Quirrell is a twitching, stammering, and nervous man who teaches Defence Against the Dark Arts. Reputedly he was a brilliant scholar, but his nerve was shattered by an encounter with vampires. Quirrell wears a turban to conceal the fact that he is voluntarily possessed by Voldemort, whose face appears on the back of Quirrell's head.
 Professor Severus Snape, who has a hooked nose, sallow complexion, and greasy black hair, teaches Potions, but would prefer to teach Defence Against the Dark Arts. Snape favours pupils in Slytherin, his own House and seizes every opportunity to humiliate others, especially Harry. Several incidents, beginning with the shooting pain in Harry's scar during the start-of-term feast, lead Harry and his friends to think Snape is aiding Voldemort.
 Argus Filch, the school caretaker who knows the school's secret passages better than anyone else except, perhaps, the Weasley twins. His cat, Mrs. Norris, aids his constant hunt for misbehaving pupils.

Other members of staff include: the dumpy Herbology teacher and Head of Hufflepuff House Professor Sprout,  Professor Flitwick, the tiny and excitable Charms teacher and Head of Ravenclaw House, the soporific History of Magic teacher, Professor Binns, a ghost who does not seem to have noticed his own death, and Madam Hooch, the Quidditch coach, who is strict, but a considerate and methodical teacher. The poltergeist Peeves wanders around the castle causing trouble wherever he can.

In the book, Rowling introduces an eclectic cast of characters. The first character to be introduced is Vernon Dursley, Harry's uncle. Most of the actions centre on the eponymous hero Harry Potter, an orphan who escapes his miserable childhood with the Dursley family. Rowling imagined him as a "scrawny, black-haired, bespectacled boy who didn't know he was a wizard" and says she transferred part of her pain about losing her mother to him. During the book, Harry makes two close friends, Ronald Weasley and Hermione Granger. Ron is described by Rowling as the ultimate best friend, "always there when you need him". Rowling has described Hermione as a "very logical, upright and good" character with "a lot of insecurity and a great fear of failure beneath her swottiness".

Rowling also imagined a supporting cast of adults. The headmaster of Hogwarts is the powerful, but kind wizard Albus Dumbledore, who becomes Harry's confidant. Rowling described him as "the epitome of goodness". His right hand is severe Minerva McGonagall, the friendly half-giant Rubeus Hagrid, who saved Harry from the Dursley family and the sinister Severus Snape. Professor Quirrell is also featured in the novel.

The main antagonists are Draco Malfoy, an elitist, bullying classmate, and Lord Voldemort, the most powerful evil wizard who becomes disembodied when he tries to kill baby Harry. According to a 1999 interview with Rowling, the character of Voldemort was created as a literary foil for Harry and his backstory was intentionally not fleshed-out at first:

Development, publication and reception

Development 

The book, which was Rowling's debut novel, was written between approximately June 1990 and some time in 1995. In 1990, Jo Rowling, as she preferred to be known, wanted to move with her boyfriend to a flat in Manchester and in her words, "One weekend after flat hunting, I took the train back to London on my own and the idea for Harry Potter fell into my head... A scrawny, little, black-haired, bespectacled boy became more and more of a wizard to me... I began to write Philosopher's Stone that very evening. Although, the first couple of pages look nothing like the finished product." Then, Rowling's mother died and, to cope with her pain, Rowling transferred her own anguish to the orphan Harry. Rowling spent six years working on Harry Potter and the Philosopher's Stone and after it was accepted by Bloomsbury, she obtained a grant of £8,000 from the Scottish Arts Council, which enabled her to plan the sequels. She sent the book to an agent and a publisher and then the second agent she approached spent a year trying to sell the book to publishers, most of whom thought it was too long at about 90,000 words. Barry Cunningham, who was building a portfolio of distinctive fantasies by new authors for Bloomsbury Children's Books, recommended accepting the book and the eight-year-old daughter of Bloomsbury's chief executive said it was "so much better than anything else".

Publication and reception in the United Kingdom 

Bloomsbury accepted the book, paying Rowling a £2,500 advance and Cunningham sent proof copies to carefully chosen authors, critics and booksellers in order to obtain comments that could be quoted when the book was launched. He was less concerned about the book's length than about its author's name, since the title sounded like a boys' book to him and he believed boys preferred books by male authors. Rowling therefore adopted the pen name J. K. Rowling just before publication.

In June 1997, Bloomsbury published Philosopher's Stone with an initial print run of 500 copies in hardback, three hundred of which were distributed to libraries. Her original name, "Joanne Rowling", can be found on the copyright page of all British editions until September 1999. (The 1998 first American edition would remove reference to "Joanne" completely.) The short initial print run was standard for first novels and Cunningham hoped booksellers would read the book and recommend it to customers. Examples from this initial print run have sold for as much as US$471,000 in a 2021 Heritage auction. Thomas Taylor created the cover for the first edition.

Lindsey Fraser, who had previously supplied one of the blurb comments, wrote what is thought to be the first published review, in The Scotsman on 28 June 1997. She described Harry Potter and the Philosopher's Stone as "a hugely entertaining thriller" and Rowling as "a first-rate writer for children". Another early review, in The Herald, said: "I have yet to find a child who can put it down." Newspapers outside Scotland started to notice the book, with glowing reviews in The Guardian and The Sunday Times and in September 1997 Books for Keeps, a magazine that specialised in children's books, gave the novel four stars out of five. Sunday Times said:"comparisons to Dahl are, this time, justified", while The Guardian called it "a richly textured novel given lift-off by an inventive wit" and The Scotsman said it had "all the makings of a classic".

In 1997 the UK edition won a National Book Award and a gold medal in the 9- to 11-year-olds category of the Nestlé Smarties Book Prize. The Smarties award, which is voted for by children, made the book well known within six months of publication, while most children's books have to wait for years. The following year, Philosopher's Stone won almost all the other major British awards that were decided by children. It was also shortlisted for children's books awards adjudicated by adults, but did not win. Sandra Beckett commented that books that were popular with children were regarded as undemanding and as not of the highest literary standards – for example, the literary establishment disdained the works of Dahl, an overwhelming favourite of children before the appearance of Rowling's books. In 2003, the novel was listed at number 22 on the BBC's survey The Big Read.

Harry Potter and the Philosopher's Stone won two publishing industry awards given for sales rather than literary merit, the British Book Awards Children's Book of the Year and the Booksellers' Association / Bookseller Author of the Year. By March 1999 UK editions had sold just over 300,000 copies and the story was still the UK's best-selling title in December 2001. A Braille edition was published in May 1998 by the Scottish Braille Press.

Platform , from which the Hogwarts Express left London, was commemorated in the real-life King's Cross railway station with a sign and a trolley apparently passing through the wall.

US publication and reception

Scholastic Corporation bought the US rights at the Bologna Book Fair in April 1997 for US$105,000, an unusually high sum for a children's book. Scholastic's Arthur Levine thought that "philosopher" sounded too archaic for readers and after some discussion (including the proposed title "Harry Potter and the School of Magic"), the American edition was published in September 1998 under the title Rowling suggested, Harry Potter and the Sorcerer's Stone. Rowling later said that she regretted this change and would have fought it if she had been in a stronger position at the time. Philip Nel has pointed out that the change lost the connection with alchemy and the meaning of some other terms changed in translation, for example from "crumpet" to "muffin". While Rowling accepted the change from both the British English "mum" and Seamus Finnigan's Irish variant "mam" to the American variant "mom" in Harry Potter and the Sorcerer's Stone, she vetoed this change in the later books, which was then reversed in later editions of Philosopher's Stone. However, Nel considered that Scholastic's translations were considerably more sensitive than most of those imposed on British English books of the time and that some other changes could be regarded as useful copyedits. Since the UK editions of early titles in the series were published months prior to the American versions, some American readers became familiar with the British English versions owing to having bought them from online retailers.

At first the most prestigious reviewers ignored the book, leaving it to book trade and library publications such as Kirkus Reviews and Booklist, which examined it only by the entertainment-oriented criteria of children's fiction. However, more penetrating specialist reviews (such as one by Cooperative Children's Book Center Choices, which noted complexity, depth and consistency in the world that Rowling had built) attracted the attention of reviewers in major newspapers. Although The Boston Globe and Michael Winerip in The New York Times complained that the final chapters were the weakest part of the book, they and most other American reviewers gave glowing praise.
A year later, the US edition was selected as an American Library Association Notable Book, a Publishers Weekly Best Book of 1998 and a New York Public Library 1998 Best Book of the Year and won Parenting Magazine Book of the Year Award for 1998, the School Library Journal Best Book of the Year and the American Library Association Best Book for Young Adults. In 2012 it was ranked number 3 on a list of the top 100 children's novels published by School Library Journal.

In August 1999, Harry Potter and the Sorcerer's Stone topped the New York Times list of best-selling fiction and stayed near the top of the list for much of 1999 and 2000, until the New York Times split its list into children's and adult sections under pressure from other publishers who were eager to see their books given higher placings. Publishers Weekly report in December 2001 on cumulative sales of children's fiction placed Harry Potter and the Sorcerer's Stone 19th among hardbacks (over 5 million copies) and 7th among paperbacks (over 6.6 million copies).

In May 2008, Scholastic announced the creation of a 10th Anniversary Edition of the book that was released on 1 October 2008 to mark the tenth anniversary of the original American release. For the fifteenth anniversary of the books, Scholastic re-released Sorcerer's Stone, along with the other six novels in the series, with new cover art by Kazu Kibuishi in 2013.

Translations 

By mid-2008, official translations of the book had been published in 67 languages. By November 2017, the book had been translated into 80 languages, the 80th being Lowland Scots. Bloomsbury have published translations in Latin and in Ancient Greek, with the latter being described as "one of the most important pieces of Ancient Greek prose written in many centuries".

Style and themes

Philip Nel highlighted the influence of Jane Austen, whom Rowling has greatly admired since the age of twelve. Both novelists greatly encourage re-reading, because details that look insignificant foreshadow important events or characters much later in the story-line – for example Sirius Black is briefly mentioned near the beginning of Harry Potter and the Philosopher's Stone, and then becomes a major character in the third to fifth books. Like Austen's heroines, Harry often has to re-examine his ideas near the ends of books. Some social behaviour in the Harry Potter books is reminiscent of Austen, for example the excited communal reading of letters. Both authors satirise social behaviour and give characters names that express their personalities. However in Nel's opinion Rowling's humour is more based on caricature and the names she invents are more like those found in Charles Dickens's stories, and Amanda Cockrell noted that many of these express their owners' traits through allusions that run from ancient Roman mythology to eighteenth-century German literature. Rowling, like the Narnia series' author C. S. Lewis, thinks there is no rigid distinction between stories for children and for adults. Nel also noted that, like many good writers for children, Rowling combines literary genresfantasy, young adult fiction, boarding school stories, Bildungsroman and many others.

Some reviewers compared Philosopher's Stone to the stories of Roald Dahl, who died in 1990. Many writers since the 1970s had been hailed as his successor, but none had attained anything near his popularity with children and, in a poll conducted shortly after the launch of Philosopher's Stone, seven of the ten most popular children's books were by Dahl, including the one in top place. The only other really popular children's author of the late 1990s was an American, R. L. Stine. Some of the story elements in Philosopher's Stone resembled parts of Dahl's stories. For example, the hero of James and the Giant Peach lost his parents and had to live with a pair of unpleasant auntsone fat and one thin rather like Mr. and Mrs. Dursley, who treated Harry as a servant. However Harry Potter was a distinctive creation, able to take on the responsibilities of an adult while remaining a child inside.

Librarian Nancy Knapp and marketing professor Stephen Brown noted the liveliness and detail of descriptions, especially of shop scenes such as Diagon Alley. Tad Brennan commented that Rowling's writing resembles that of Homer: "rapid, plain, and direct in expression." Stephen King admired "the sort of playful details of which only British fantasists seem capable" and concluded that they worked because Rowling enjoys a quick giggle and then moves briskly forward.

Nicholas Tucker described the early Harry Potter books as looking back to Victorian and Edwardian children's stories: Hogwarts was an old-style boarding school in which the teachers addressed pupils formally by their surnames and were most concerned with the reputations of the houses with which they were associated; characters' personalities were plainly shown by their appearances, starting with the Dursleys; evil or malicious characters were to be crushed rather than reformed, including Argus Filch's cat Mrs Norris; and the hero, a mistreated orphan who found his true place in life, was charismatic and good at sports, but considerate and protective towards the weak. Several other commentators have stated that the books present a highly stratified society including many social stereotypes. However Karin Westerman drew parallels with 1990s Britain: a class system that was breaking down but defended by those whose power and status it upheld; the multi-ethnic composition of Hogwarts' students; the racial tensions between the various intelligent species; and school bullying.

Susan Hall wrote that there is no rule of law in the books, as the actions of Ministry of Magic officials are unconstrained by laws, accountability or any kind of legal challenge. This provides an opportunity for Voldemort to offer his own horrific version of order. As a side-effect Harry and Hermione, who were brought up in the highly regulated Muggle world, find solutions by thinking in ways unfamiliar to wizards. For example, Hermione notes that one obstacle to finding the Philosopher's Stone is a test of logic rather than magical power, and that most wizards have no chance of solving it.

Nel suggested that the unflattering characterisation of the extremely conventional, status-conscious, materialistic Dursleys was Rowling's reaction to the family policies of the British government in the early 1990s, which treated the married heterosexual couple as the "preferred norm", while the author was a single mother. Harry's relationships with adult and juvenile wizards are based on affection and loyalty. This is reflected in his happiness whenever he is a temporary member of the Weasley family throughout the series, and in his treatment of first Rubeus Hagrid and later Remus Lupin and Sirius Black as father-figures.

Legacy

Sequels 

The second book, Harry Potter and the Chamber of Secrets, was originally published in the UK on 2 July 1998 and later, in the US on 2 June 1999. Harry Potter and the Prisoner of Azkaban was then published a year later in the UK on 8 July 1999 and in the US on 8 September 1999. Harry Potter and the Goblet of Fire was published on 8 July 2000 at the same time by Bloomsbury and Scholastic. Harry Potter and the Order of the Phoenix is the longest book in the series at 766 pages in the UK version and 870 pages in the US version. It was published worldwide in English on 21 June 2003. Harry Potter and the Half-Blood Prince was published on 16 July 2005 and sold 11 million copies in the first 24 hours of its worldwide release. The seventh and final novel, Harry Potter and the Deathly Hallows, was published on 21 July 2007. The book sold 11 million copies within 24 hours of its release: 2.7 million copies in the UK and 8.3 million in the US.

Illustrated version 
An illustrated version of Harry Potter and the Philosopher's Stone was released on 6 October 2015, with illustrations by Jim Kay. The book carries over 100 illustrations and will be followed by illustrated versions of all seven books from the series by the same artist.

Podcast version 
In May 2020, a reading podcast by Spotify was created and entitled Harry Potter at Home: Readings. Each chapter is narrated by a celebrity guest from the Harry Potter and Wizarding World franchises.

Film adaptation 

In 1999, Rowling sold the film rights of the first two Harry Potter books to Warner Bros. for a reported £1 million. Rowling demanded that the principal cast be kept strictly British, but allowed for the casting of Irish actors such as Richard Harris as Dumbledore and of foreign actors as characters of the same nationalities in later books. After extensive casting, filming began in September 2000 at Leavesden Film Studios and in London, with production ending in July 2001. Harry Potter and the Philosopher's Stone was released in London on 14 November 2001. Reviewers' comments were positive, as reflected by an 80% Fresh rating on Rotten Tomatoes and by a score of 64% at Metacritic, representing "generally favourable reviews".

Video games 

Five unique video games by different developers were released between 2001 and 2003 by Electronic Arts, that were loosely based on the film and book:

Uses in education and business 

Writing about clinical teaching in medical schools, Jennifer Conn contrasted Snape's technical expertise with his intimidating behaviour towards students. Quidditch coach Madam Hooch on the other hand, illustrated useful techniques in the teaching of physical skills, including breaking down complex actions into sequences of simple ones and helping students to avoid common errors. Joyce Fields wrote that the books illustrate four of the five main topics in a typical first-year sociology class: "sociological concepts including culture, society, and socialisation; stratification and social inequality; social institutions; and social theory".

Stephen Brown noted that the early Harry Potter books, especially Harry Potter and the Philosopher's Stone, were a runaway success despite inadequate and poorly organised marketing. Brown advised marketing executives to be less preoccupied with rigorous statistical analyses and the "analysis, planning, implementation, and control" model of management. Instead he recommended that they should treat the stories as "a marketing masterclass", full of enticing products and brand names. For example, a real-world analogue of Bertie Bott's Every Flavour Beans was introduced under licence in 2000 by toymaker Hasbro.

Release history

Notes

References

Works cited

External links 

 
 Background information and storylines from the Harry Potter Lexicon
 

01
1997 children's books
1997 British novels
1997 fantasy novels
Bloomsbury Publishing books
British Book Award-winning works
British children's novels
British novels adapted into films
Fiction about alchemy
Fiction set in 1981
Fiction set in 1991
Fiction set in 1992
Novels about spirit possession
Scholastic Corporation books
1997 debut novels
Children's fantasy novels